Fred Lipsius (born 19 November 1943 in the Bronx) is an American musician who is the original saxophonist and arranger for the jazz-rock band Blood, Sweat & Tears, for which he played alto saxophone and piano. He was with the band from 1967 to 1971 and has collected 3 GRAMMY Awards and 9 Gold Records.

Before Blood, Sweat & Tears, Lipsius played with the Ronn Metcalfe Orchestra.

Lipsius has performed with Simon & Garfunkel, Janis Joplin, and jazz greats Cannonball Adderley, Thelonious Monk, Zoot Sims, Eddie Gómez, Al Foster, George Mraz, Larry Willis, Randy Brecker, and Rodney Jones. He has written music for and performed on over 30 CDs as both a leader and sideman. He has authored six books on jazz improvisation and jazz reading.

In 2020, Lipsius retired from Berklee College of Music in Boston, Massachusetts, USA after teaching full-time for 35 years.

In retirement, Lipsius has focused his efforts on his visual art. He has been creating digital pieces since 2000 and has had a number of public showings, some of which have been accompanied by his music.

Lipsius creates his pieces with Photoshop and other materials and has said of his art, "Producing this art has been nothing but fun and a big gift for me. My pieces are mostly improvised with little or no preconceived idea of what they should be. In viewing my art, please know that anything you can imagine already exists somewhere!”

Lipsius has recently listed some of his pieces as NFTs (non-fungible tokens) on OpenSea.

Biography 

Born in the Bronx, New York City on November 19, 1943, Lipsius began playing the clarinet at age 9, alto and tenor saxophones in junior high school, and the piano at Music and Art High School in Manhattan. He continued his studies at Berklee School of Music (1961–62).

Lipsius was a saxophonist, arranger and conductor with Blood, Sweat & Tears from 1967 to 1971. He also doubled on keyboards. While with the band, he won nine Gold Records plus a Grammy Award for his arrangement of "Spinning Wheel". Lipsius also arranged and co-arranged, respectively, the hit singles "Hi-De-Ho" and "You've Made Me So Very Happy". In both the Down Beat and Playboy jazz polls he placed in the top ten of the alto sax category. Lipsius has composed, arranged and produced radio and TV commercials, including 2 CBS TV logos- themes introducing the season's upcoming shows. In the spring of 1982, he toured in Japan and Europe with Simon and Garfunkel.

References

External links 
 Fred Lipsius' OpenSea NFT Collection
 Fred Lipsius' Music website
 Fred Lipsius' YouTube Channel

1943 births
Living people
American clarinetists
American rock musicians
American male saxophonists
People from the Bronx
Berklee College of Music faculty
Grammy Award winners
Blood, Sweat & Tears members
20th-century American pianists
21st-century American saxophonists
American male pianists
21st-century American pianists
21st-century clarinetists
20th-century American male musicians
21st-century American male musicians